The Bemidji State Beavers women's ice hockey program represented the Bemidji State University during the 2014-15 NCAA Division I women's ice hockey season. The Beavers won 21 games, and were ranked 10th nationally by both major polling organizations.  During the WCHA Conference tournament, Bemidji State upset the powerful Minnesota Golden Gophers.

Offseason
August 1: Alumni Tess Dusik and Jessica Havel signed professional contracts to play for Gothenburg HC in Sweden

2014–15 Beavers

Schedule

|-
!colspan=12 style=""| Regular Season

|-
!colspan=12 style=""| WCHA Tournament

Awards and honors
Brittni Mowat, G, 2014-2015 Women's CCM Hockey Division I All-American, First Team 
James Scanlan, WCHA Coach of the Year 
Brittni Mowat, G, All-WCHA First Team 
Alexis Joyce, D, All-WCHA Rookie Team

References

Bemidji State
Bemidji State Beavers women's ice hockey seasons
Bemidji